The Vienna Document is a series of agreements on confidence and security-building measures between the states of Europe, starting in 1990, with subsequent updates in 1992, 1994, 1999 and 2011. The Vienna Document 2011 was adopted by 57 Organization for Security and Co-operation in Europe (OSCE) participating states, including the states of Central Asia and Russia (for its territory west of the Ural Mountains). It described its zone of application (ZOA) as "the whole of Europe, as well as the adjoining sea area and air space".

Creation
The Vienna Document was first adopted in 1990 as a combination of confidence and security-building measure (CSBMs) from the 1975 Helsinki Accords and the 1986 Stockholm Document. The Vienna Document on CSBMs and the Treaty on Conventional Armed Forces in Europe (CFE) were seen as parallel peace process components.

Updates

1990s
The Vienna Document was updated in 1992, 1994,1999 and 2011.

2000s
The Vienna Document was seen as a low priority in the West in the 2000s. Russian suspension of the Treaty on Conventional Armed Forces in Europe (CFE) in 2007 complicated negotiations for updating the Vienna Document.

2010s
The 2010 adoption of the Vienna Document plus, initiated by Russia, led to the Vienna Document 2011. Four Vienna Document Plus decisions, including prior notification of sub-threshold major military activities and on the lengths of air base visits, were added in 2012 and 2013.

Full updates to the Vienna Document stopped with the 2014 Russo-Ukrainian War. Vienna Document 2011 confidence-building measures were used during the first year of the war, with 19 verification actions in Ukraine by 27 states and 5 verification actions in Russia by 11 states, including Ukraine, by October 2014. Vienna Document 2011 confidence-building measures were blocked in the parts of Ukraine not controlled by Ukrainian government forces.

During negotiations in 2016 and 2018, Western negotiators aimed to strengthen the Vienna Document, while Russian negotiators preferred to implement the Vienna Document 2011 and following Vienna Document Plus decisions.

In 2017, the Vienna Document, the CFE and the Treaty on Open Skies were seen by the OSCE as "a web of interlocking and mutually reinforcing arms control obligations and commitments" that "together ... enhance predictability, transparency and military stability and reduce the risk of a major conflict in Europe."

2020s
As of late 2020, military exercises by both Western and Russian forces took place as snap exercises (close to borders and on short notice) that are not covered by the Vienna Document 2011. Researcher Wolfgang Zellner saw the mix of cooperation and deterrence that had developed through to the early 2000s as evolving to an increasing mutual deterrence scenario.

As of late 2020, Russian objections to updating the Vienna Document were that a broader arms control agreement was needed.

Proposed updates
Updates to the Vienna Document proposed around 2016 include lowering the threshold for prior notification of military activities, risk reduction (Chapter III) proposals, additional or stronger inspections, independent fact-finding missions, and creating a centralised OSCE database on OSCE participating states' main weapons systems. Forty-three of the OSCE participating states declared after the December 2020 meeting of the OSCE Ministerial Council that their intention was to "enhance reciprocal military transparency and predictability and reduc[e] risk by updating the Vienna document".

Structure
The Vienna Document 2011 includes eleven chapters. Except for Chapter II, the chapters apply to military forces in the zone of application (ZOA), defined as the land and air space of Europe west of the Ural Mountains and the Central Asian participating states, and surrounding sea areas.
 I. Annual exchange of military information (AEMI)
 II. Defence planning
 III. Risk reduction
 IV. Contacts
 V. Prior notification of certain military activities (CMA)
 VI. Observation of certain military activities
 VII. Annual calendars
 VIII. Constraining provisions
 IX. Compliance and verification
 X. Regional measures
 XI. Annual Implementation Assessment Meeting (AIAM)
 XII. Final provisions

Actions
The annual exchanges of military information (Chapter I in Vienna Document 2011) take place in Vienna in December. Until 2015, when Russia completely stopped participating in the Treaty on Conventional Armed Forces in Europe (CFE), CFE and Vienna Document military information exchange was done together at the December Vienna meetings. As of the 15 February 2022 emergency Vienna Document meeting called by Ukraine during the 2021–2022 Russo-Ukrainian crisis after Russia failed to respond to Ukraine's request to give details about the Russian military buildup around Ukraine, less than 11 emergency Vienna Document meetings had been held.

1990s and 2000s
From 1992 to 2012, an average of 90 inspections and 45 evaluation visits were carried out annually.

2010s
Russia used the provisions of the Document in early April 2015 to force NATO to agree to a Russian inspection team being present at the 2015 Joint Warrior exercise off the coast of Scotland.

2020s 

On April 9, 2021, Ukraine invoked Paragraph 16.1.3 of the Vienna Document to try to get an explanation on suspicious Russia's military activities near Ukrainian border and in Crimea that was left unanswered by Russian authorities. On April 10, 2022 Ukraine has formally requested a meeting with the council of Organization for Security and Co-operation in Europe (OSCE) which Russian authorities also (allegedly) refused to attend. US, Germany, France and Poland missions to OSCE have decried Russia's move as "unhelpful".

In November and December 2021, during the 2021–2022 Russo-Ukrainian crisis, Russian military officers made a Vienna Document 2011 visit to Latvia to inspect Latvian military forces. In January 2022, a pre-planned 24–29 January arms inspection by Latvian military officers to the Bryansk and Smolensk regions of Russia, again under the Vienna Document 2011, was refused by Russian authorities, who stated the reason as COVID-19 pandemic restrictions. The Latvian Ministry of Defence commented that the pandemic had not prevented the holding of the exercise. The Defence Minister, Artis Pabriks, described the Russian reason for refusal as"a poor excuse" that "raise[d] suspicions that Russia want[ed] to hide something by not disclosing the actual scope and intent of its military movements as required by [the] OSCE cooperation framework".On 10 February 2022, Estonia, Latvia and Lithuania invoked the Vienna Document 2011, requesting information from Belarus on "the total number of troops, battle tanks, armoured combat vehicles, artillery pieces, mortars and rocket launchers, envisaged sorties per aircraft, and rapid-reaction forces" of the Union Resolve 2022 military exercise planned for Russian forces during 10–20 February 2022 in Belarus. The Russian ambassador to Belarus, Boris Gryzlov, stated in a television interview that the forces involved were below the notification limit, and "therefore there is nothing to worry about". The Belarusian official response stated that the size of the exercise was under the reporting threshold. Estonian officials described the Belarusian response as "insufficient" and interpreted the response as showing "no interest in transparency and confidence building".

On 11 February, 2022, Ukraine invoked Chapter III of the Vienna Document, risk reduction, requesting Russia to provide "detailed explanations on military activities in the areas adjacent to the territory of Ukraine and in the temporarily occupied Crimea." Russia did not respond within the required 48-hour deadline. On 13 February, Ukraine requested an emergency OSCE meeting within 48 hours for Russia to provide a response. On 14 February, the Ukrainian Defence Minister Oleksii Reznikov and the Belarusian Defence Minister Viktor Khrenin agreed on confidence-building and transparency measures for risk reduction. The plan included visits by Reznikov to the Russian–Belarusian Allied Resolve 2022 military exercise and by Khrenin to the Ukrainian Zametil 2022 military exercise. Reznikov described the agreement as a positive signal. On 15 February, the Vienna Document emergency meeting was held for OSCE participant states, as requested by Ukraine. The Russian OSCE representative was absent from the meeting. The US ambassador to the OSCE, Michael R. Carpenter, described the Russian absence as "unfortunat[e] and regrettabl[e]".

Similar agreements
While the Vienna Document 2011 is limited to forces in Europe and Central Asia, the Global Exchange of Military Information applies to all forces of the participating states, wherever located.

References

International law
Arms control
Organization for Security and Co-operation in Europe
Russia–NATO relations